The fourspine cichlid (Neolamprologus tetracanthus) is a species of cichlid endemic to Lake Tanganyika where it lives in areas with sandy substrates.  In addition to feeding on other fishes and insect larvae, this species is specialized to suck molluscs from their shells. This species can reach a length of  TL.  This species can also be found in the aquarium trade.

References

Fourspine
Fish described in 1899
Taxa named by George Albert Boulenger
Fish of Lake Tanganyika
Taxonomy articles created by Polbot